The Shahid Derakhshan Stadium is a multi-purpose stadium in Robat Karim, Iran.  It is currently used mostly for football matches and is owned by, and the home of, Saba Battery F.C. The stadium holds 12,000 people.

External links
Derakhshan Stadium page on Official Saba Battery Website

Football venues in Iran
Sports venues in Tehran
Multi-purpose stadiums in Iran